Ulmeni (formerly Șilimeghiu;) is a town in Maramureș County, Crișana, Romania. It is located on the left bank of the Someș river. It was declared a town in 2004. The town administers seven villages: Arduzel (Szamosardó), Chelința (Kelence), Mânău (Monó), Someș-Uileac (Szilágyújlak), Tohat (Szamostóhát), Țicău (Szamoscikó) and Vicea (Vicsa).

Demographics

In 2011, 53.6% of inhabitants were Romanians, 23.7% Hungarians and 22.5% Roma. In 2002, 69.5% were Romanian Orthodox, 23.2% Reformed, 4% Pentecostal, 1% Greek-Catholic, 0.5% Roman Catholic and 1.3% stated they belonged to another religion.

Image gallery

References

Populated places in Maramureș County
Localities in Crișana
Towns in Romania